The 1983 Mid-American Conference men's basketball tournament was held March 10-12 at various MAC basketball areans.  Second seeded Ohio defeated top-seeded  in the championship game by  the score of 74–64 to win their first MAC men's basketball tournament and a bid to the NCAA tournament. There they defeated Illinois State before losing to Kentucky in the second round.  John Devereaux of Ohio was named the tournament MVP.

Format
Seven of the ten MAC teams participated.  Games were played on the home court of the better seeded team.  The final was played at Anderson Arena in Bowling Green, Ohio.

Bracket

References

Mid-American Conference men's basketball tournament
Tournament
MAC men's basketball tournament
MAC men's basketball tournament